Murcielagos Island locally known as Pulo Baliudyong is a small low-lying island in the Sulu Sea off the coast of Zamboanga del Norte in the southern Philippine island of Mindanao. It is known for its white coral-sand beaches and rich marine resources. To its west lies an islet called Bayangan Island. The two islands are collectively known as Murcielagos Islands and are administratively part of the Labason poblacion of Antonino.

Protected area
The island is a nesting ground for marine turtles and several migratory seabirds. The surrounding reefs support a rich marine fauna, including giant clams. It was declared a protected area in April 2000 known as the Murcielagos Island Protected Landscape and Seascape. It covers the  Murcielagos Island with a buffer zone covering  of  surrounding municipal waters including Bayangan Island.

See also
 List of islands of the Philippines

References

External links
 Murcielagos Island at OpenStreetMap

Islands of Zamboanga del Norte
Tourist attractions in Zamboanga del Norte
Protected landscapes and seascapes of the Philippines